Aldermaston Pottery was a pottery located in the Berkshire village of Aldermaston, England. It was founded in 1955 by Alan Caiger-Smith and was known for its tin-glaze pottery and particularly its lustre ware. His first assistant, Geoffrey Eastop, joined him in 1956, a year after the pottery started. They were joined in 1961 by David Tipler and Edgar Campden, who remained there until 1975 and 1993 respectively. Over a period of forty years, around sixty assistants worked at the pottery.

In 1965, the pottery was the subject of a television documentary produced by Michael Darlow.

The pottery scaled back its production in June 1993 when Caiger-Smith partially retired and stopped hiring assistants. It continued to be operated commercially until it was sold in 2006, and the building has now been converted into a private dwelling.

Reading Museum has an extensive collection of Aldermaston pottery displayed in its Atrium gallery. The pottery can also be seen on display at the Victoria & Albert Museum in London and the Ashmolean Museum in Oxford.

Potters
 Alan Caiger-Smith
 Geoffrey Eastop
 David Tipler
 Julian Bellmont
 Edgar Campden
 Harriet Coleridge
 Mohamed Hamid
 Andrew Hazelden
 Myra McDonnell
 Laurence McGowan
 Simon Rich

References

Further reading

2006 disestablishments in England
Companies established in 1995
Companies disestablished in 2006
Ceramics manufacturers of England
English pottery
Arts in Berkshire
History of Berkshire
Studio pottery